This is the complete list of women's African Games medalists in swimming from 1973 to 2019. Before 2015 it was known as the All-Africa Games.

Events

50m Freestyle

100m Freestyle

200m Freestyle

400m Freestyle

800m Freestyle

1500m Freestyle

50m Backstroke

100m Backstroke

200m Backstroke

50m Breastroke

100m Breastroke

200m Breastroke

50m Butterfly

100m Butterfly

200m Butterfly

200 m Individual Medley

400 m Individual Medley

4x100 m Freestyle Relay

4x200 m Freestyle Relay

4x100 m Medley Relay

References

medalists
Lists of swimming medalists